Ulya Norashen (also, Ul’ya Norashen and Norashen-Uliya) is a village in the Nakhchivan Autonomous Republic of Azerbaijan.

References 

Populated places in Nakhchivan Autonomous Republic